Cave-In-Rock is a village in Hardin County, Illinois, United States. Its principal feature and tourist attraction is nearby Cave-In-Rock, on the banks of the Ohio River. In 1816, the earliest known permanent white settlers arrived and started building a town near the cave. The town was originally known as Rock and Cave, Illinois, with a post office under this name. On October 24, 1849, the town was officially renamed Cave-In-Rock. Cave-In-Rock was incorporated as a village in 1901. The population was 318 at the 2010 census.

Beginning in the 1790s, Cave-in-Rock became a refuge stronghold for frontier outlaws, on the run from the law which included river pirates and highwaymen Samuel Mason and James Ford, tavern owner/highwayman Isaiah L. Potts, serial killers/bandits the Harpe brothers, counterfeiters Philip Alston, Peter Alston, John Duff, Eson Bixby, and the Sturdivant Gang, and the post-American Civil War bandit, Logan Belt.

Geography

Cave-In-Rock is located in southeastern Hardin County at  (37.470050, -88.166297). It is bordered to the south by the Ohio River, which forms the state boundary with Kentucky. Cave-In-Rock is the southern terminus of Illinois Route 1, which leads north from the ferry  to its northern terminus in Chicago.

Demographics

As of the census of 2000, there were 346 people, 165 households, and 96 families residing in the village. The racial makeup of the village was 98.27% White, 1.16% other races, and 0.58% from two or more races. Hispanic or Latino of any race were 2.02% of the population.

There were 165 households, out of which 28.5% had children under the age of 18 living with them, 44.8% were married couples living together, 10.3% had a female householder with no husband present, and 41.8% were non-families. 41.2% of all households were made up of individuals, and 28.5% had someone living alone who was 65 years of age or older.  The average household size was 2.10 and the average family size was 2.82.

In the village, the population was spread out, with 23.4% under 18, 7.5% from 18 to 24, 24.9% from 25 to 44, 19.4% from 45 to 64, and 24.9% who were 65 or older.  The median age was 40 years. For every 100 females, there were 81.2 males.  For every 100 females age 18 and over, there were 82.8 males.

The median income for a household in the village was $20,694, and the median income for a family was $28,393. Males had a median income of $35,833 versus $18,125 for females. The per capita income for the village was $12,050.  About 20.5% of families and 28.6% of the population were below the poverty line, including 43.8% of those under age 18 and 24.1% of those age 65 or over.

The Cave

Cave-in-Rock's primary feature is a striking  riverside cave formed by wind and water erosion and by cataclysmic effects of the 1811–12 New Madrid earthquakes. The first European to come across it was M. de Lery of France, who found it in 1739 and called it "caverne dans Le Roc". Other names for the cave include Rock-In-Cave, Rocking Cave, Rock-and-Cave, House of Nature, The Cave, Big Cave, and Murrell's Cave. The cave is the main feature of Illinois' Cave-in-Rock State Park, established in 1929.

History
From the 1790s to the 1870s, the area around Cave-in-Rock was plagued by what historians as early as the 1830s referred to as the "Ancient Colony of Horse-Thieves, Counterfeiters and Robbers", and better known today due to Otto Rothert's history early in the 20th century as the "Outlaws of Cave-in-Rock".

In 1790, counterfeiters Philip Alston and John Duff (or John McElduff) used the cave as some type of rendezvous, though details are scarce. Although folklore printed in 19th century histories failed to establish a prior connection between the two men, both had lived in the area of Natchez, Mississippi, at the start of the Revolutionary War.

Duff was living upriver a few miles, either at Battery Rock or across the Ohio River at what would become Caseyville, Kentucky, when in 1797 Samuel Mason moved his base of operations from Diamond Island and Red Banks to the cave and made it the home of river pirates. Two of Mason's brothers had been business partners of Duff in Kaskaskia, Illinois, in the 1780s. Mason created a combination tavern, gambling den, brothel, and criminal refuge. His men lured in gullible river travelers and then robbed and killed them.

James Wilson, also known as Bully Wilson, may actually have been an alias for Samuel Mason, the next leader of the gang after Mason's hasty departure, or possibly the front man for Mason's operation. He may be the Wilson who married one of Mason's nieces. In 1799, he hung a sign over the cave's entrance saying "Wilson's Liquor Vault and House for Entertainment".

By this time, Duff and his associates had been making salt (or looking for silver) in the area around the Illinois Salines along the Saline River in southeastern Illinois. A detachment from the U.S. Army garrison at Fort Massac, down river from Cave-In-Rock, captured him and three of his men, Blakely, Hazle and Hall. The soldiers took their prisoners by boat down the Saline River to the Ohio River, intending to return to the fort. Old histories do not explain why they stopped at the cave. Subsequent events suggest it took place during the spring of 1799, when Wilson was in business, making it a stop for entertainment. Duff and his men escaped and overpowered the soldiers. They tied them up, put them in a boat, and pushed it into the river to float downstream to the fort. On June 4, 1799, the commandant of Fort Massac, Captain Zebulon Pike Sr., father of the future explorer of Pikes Peak, hired a French Canadian coureur de bois and three Shawnee warriors to assassinate Duff, which they did.

The infamous Harpe brothers also reached the cave region in the spring of 1799. They are associated with two separate stories at the cave and one at the infamous Potts Spring area to the north. The first story has them pushing a young couple off the top of the cliff above the cave. They survived. The second was an act of piracy in which only one man survived. Later, he was forced off the cliff as well, this time involving the man being tied down to a horse. Neither survived. The Potts Spring story is recalled as a murder of two or three hunters. This Harpe murder site within twenty years would become the future location of the legendary Potts Inn, which was presumed to be a human death trap for unsuspecting travelers along the Ford's Ferry High Water Road, an early frontier highway, who wanted to spend the night for food and lodging.

Mason and Wilson's time at the cave may have come to an end during the summer of 1799, when they were attacked by a group of bounty hunters/vigilantes under the leadership of Captain Young calling themselves "The Exterminators". No contemporary accounts attest to river pirates occupying the cave in the first decade of the 19th century. The Harpes retreated back into Kentucky, while Mason traveled downriver and began to focus on highway robbery along the Natchez Trace.

The next generation of outlaws in the region sprang either from the Sturdivant Gang, a group of counterfeiters based at Sturdivant Fort, on top of the bluffs overlooking the Ohio River at what is now Rosiclare, Illinois; or the Ford's Ferry Gang led by James Ford, based a few miles upriver from the cave at what became known as Ford's Ferry, Kentucky. Law enforcement officials led three raids against Sturdivant Fort in 1822 and 1823. Although it is not clear what happened following the raids, the gang had disappeared from the area by 1830. The Ford's Ferry Gang was broken up following the mysterious deaths or murders of James Ford's two sons, followed by his own assassination in 1833.

Even after the death of Ford, outlaws remained. Isaiah L. Potts operated Potts Inn on the Ford's Ferry High Water Road in Illinois north of the cave. Travelers checked in, but sometimes failed to check out. This presumed frontier hotel was very similar to the Bloody Benders' Wayside Inn, which appeared fifty years later in Labette County, Kansas. The legend of Billy Potts, the returning son who was murdered unknowingly by his father, likely took place in the months following Ford's assassination. This tragic story of poetic justice has taken on folklorish proportions. Records show the elder Potts and his wife separated in 1834 or 1835.

Eson Bigsby (the first name sometimes spelled "Eason" or "Enos" and the last name sometimes spelled "Bixby") took up counterfeiting in Hardin County in the decades following the Sturdivants. His attack on his wife Anna in an effort to find out where her first husband's money was buried dates to the early 1860s and led to the legends of Anna Bixby, her treasure and her ghost. She survived running off a cliff in the dark. She is the namesake of the Anna Bixby Women's Center in nearby Harrisburg, Illinois.

Although not completely connected to the "Ancient Colony", Logan Belt and the Logan Belt Gang terrorized Hardin County in the 1870s and 1880s, until Belt was assassinated.

In the middle of the 1800s, church services were being held in the cave. This earliest Christian congregation eventually formed the Big Creek Baptist Church. Founded in 1807, it was the first church organized in southeastern Illinois. Cave-In-Rock incorporated in 1839, in the same year that Hardin County was created from a section of Pope County.

The well-wooded,  hills and the rugged bluffs along the river—commanding expansive views of the famous waterway—became Cave-In-Rock State Park".

In popular culture
In Walt Disney's Davy Crockett and the River Pirates, Davy Crockett and Mike Fink anachronistically fight Sam Mason and his pirates. Also, at Walt Disney World's Magic Kingdom, there is a scene called "Cut-Throat Corner" and "Wilson's Cave Inn" that can be seen on the bank of the Rivers of America while riding the Liberty Belle Riverboat around Tom Sawyer's Island. This scene is based upon the real life Cave-In-Rock and the activity of river pirates during that time period.

A scene of the MGM classic How the West Was Won was filmed at the cave as well as at Battery Rock. In 1997, The History Channel show In Search of History filmed at the site for an episode entitled "River Pirates".

The "ninth book" of Christopher Ward's 1932 novel The Strange Adventures of Jonathan Drew; A Rolling Stone is titled "Cave-In-Rock". The action is set in 1824. Jonathan rescues two slaves duped into running away and working for a gang of dangerous outlaws who use Cave-In-Rock as their base of operations.

The Gathering of the Juggalos was held in Cave-In-Rock from 2007 to 2013.

The multi-day heavy metal festival Full Terror Assault (FTA Open Air) takes place once a year at the Hogrock Ranch and Campground. 

L. A. Meyer's novel Mississippi Jack features the heroine leading an anachronistic raid against river pirates as an homage to the aforementioned Davy Crockett episode.

In 2009, artist Greg Stimac photographed Cave-In-Rock's cave for his series of outlaw hideouts. In 2013, his photograph "Ancient Colony of Horse-Thieves, Counterfeiters and Robbers" was included in The Seven Borders, an exhibition curated by Joey Yates at the Kentucky Museum of Art and Craft.

See also
List of cities and towns along the Ohio River

References

Allen, John W.  It Happened in Southern Illinois, Carbondale, IL: Southern Illinois University Press, 1968.
Allen, John W.  Legends and lore of southern Illinois, Carbondale, IL: Southern Illinois University Press, 1963.
Asbury, Herbert. The French Quarter:  The Informal History of the New Orleans Underworld, 1936.
Botkin, B.A.  A Treasury of Mississippi River folklore: stories, ballads & traditions of the mid-American river country, Crown Publishers, 1955.
Caldwell, N.W. "Fort Massac: The American Frontier Post: 1778-1805," Journal of the Illinois State Historical Society, 1908.
Coates, Robert M. The outlaw years: the history of the land pirates of the Natchez trace, Macau lay Company, 1930.
Jackson, Shadrach L. The life of Logan Belt he noted desperado of Southern Illinois : a complete life history of the most daring desperado ever know to civilization ; a true and vividly written narrative. Cave-in-Rock, IL, 1888.
Rothert, Otto A.  The Outlaws of Cave-In-Rock, Otto A. Rothert, Cleveland 1924; rpt. 1996 
Underwood, Thomas Taylor. Journal, Thomas Taylor Underwood, March 26, 1792 to March 18, 1800: an old soldier in Wayne's Army, Cincinnati, Ohio: Society of Colonial Wars in the State of Ohio, 1945.
Wagner, Mark and Mary McCorvie. "Going to See the Varmint: Piracy in Myth and Reality on the Ohio and Mississippi Rivers, 1785-1830," X Marks the Spot: The Archaeology of Piracy, Univ. Press of Florida, 2006.
Wellman, Paul I.  Spawn of Evil, Doubleday, 1964.
Papers of the War Department 1784–1800, https://web.archive.org/web/20181225225053/http://wardepartmentpapers.org/blog/?cat=8&paged=2,
Bibliography of Books on Cave-In-Rock, Illinois and Vicinity
 Cave-In-Rock and Harden County History
Cave-in-Rock in the Civil War
Cave-in-Rock, Illinois Early History
Duff and Alston in Cave-in-Rock
Samuel Mason biography
The Harpe Brothers
James Ford: 'Satan's Ferryman' and 'Outlaw of Cave-in-Rock'
The Raid on Sturdivant Fort
Sturdivant the Counterfeiter
Ford's Ferry Gang and Sturdivant Gang Rogue's Gallery
Isaiah L. Potts (Billy Potts Sr.) and Polly Blue of Potts Hill (Potts Inn), by William R. Carr
The Life of Logan Belt, by Shadrach Jackson and Who Killed Logan Belt, by John Belt

External links
Cave-In-Rock State Park
Cave in Rock at unofficial Shawnee National Forest/Southern Illinois website
Cave in Rock Ferry
Cave-In-Rock Frontier Days (third weekend in September)
The Cave - Lewis and Clark Expedition - Illinois Historical Marker
Folklore of the Bloody History of Cave-In-Rock, Ghosts of the Prairie.com
2010 Cave-In-Rock Crime Rate Indexes

1849 establishments in Illinois
Villages in Hardin County, Illinois
Villages in Illinois
State parks of Illinois
Populated places established in 1849
Pirate dens and locations
Illinois populated places on the Ohio River
Landforms of Hardin County, Illinois
19th-century pirates